Spider-Man, also known as Spider-Man: The Animated Series, is an American animated television series based on the Marvel Comics superhero of the same name. The show ran on the Fox Kids Network for five seasons, consisting of 65 episodes, from November 19, 1994, to January 31, 1998. The series also aired in syndication on Fox Family Channel, Toon Disney and ABC Family. As of 2021, it is available to stream on the paid service Disney+.

Series overview

Episodes

Season 1 (1994–95)

Season 2 (1995–96)
Each individual title had the "Neogenic Nightmare" chapter prefix to it.

Season 3 (1996) 
Each individual title had "The Sins of the Fathers" chapter prefix to it.

Season 4 (1997)
Each individual title had the "Partners in Danger" chapter prefix to it.

Season 5 (1997–98)
This season has four main story arcs: "Six Forgotten Warriors" (episodes 2 to 6), "The Return of Hydro-Man" (episodes 7 to 8) "Secret Wars" (episodes 9 to 11) and "Spider Wars" (episodes 12 and 13).

Notes

References

Sources

External links 
 

Episodes
Lists of Spider-Man television series episodes
Lists of American children's animated television series episodes